Lagging may refer to: 

 Thermal insulation
 Lagging (epidemiology)
 Lagging indicator (economics)

See also
 Lag (disambiguation)